The Providencia–Cayman Sign Language family is a possible language family of two related sign languages: Providencia Sign and Old Cayman Sign.

References 

Sign languages
Sign language families